Sal Sansonetti (born 24 January 1946) is an Australian former cyclist. He competed in the team time trial event at the 1976 Summer Olympics. He is a twin brother of Remo Sansonetti. The brothers were chosen as joint flag-bearers for the Australian team at the 1978 Commonwealth Games. The Sansonettis produced the bikes for the Australian team.

References

External links
 

1946 births
Living people
Sportspeople from the Province of L'Aquila
Australian male cyclists
Olympic cyclists of Australia
Cyclists at the 1976 Summer Olympics
Cyclists from Abruzzo
Italian emigrants to Australia